E. J. Su is an American comic book artist and penciller. He was born in Taiwan and moved to the United States at the age of 14. He is best known for his work on IDW Publishing's Transformers (2005) comic book. He also worked as illustrator for Castlevania: Belmont Legacy.

He has also worked for Image Comics on Tech Jacket (2002), a six-issue limited series, with writer Robert Kirkman.

References

External links
 Prototype Garage  Official blogsite
 EJ-Su at deviantART

American comics artists
American people of Taiwanese descent
Living people
Year of birth missing (living people)